yes, formally incorporated as D.B.S. Satellite Services (1998) Ltd, is the sole direct broadcast satellite television provider in Israel. It broadcasts multichannel TV and VOD services via satellites Amos-3 and Amos-7. It also offers DVR capabilities, and 4K support.

In 2017, yes served about 600,000 subscribers.

History
Yes began broadcasting in July 2000. The largest shareholder of the provider is the Bezeq corporation, which holds up to 49% of its shares. The early years of the company were unstable due to technical and financial difficulties. Even though the three cable companies in Israel - Matav, Tevel and Arutzei Zahav - sought to compete with the satellite company by slashing prices, the subscriber base grew due to the new services that Yes offered, as well as the lack of cable coverage in many rural areas. In response,  the cable companies merged into one company under the name HOT.

Yes provides television services to more than half a million customers using two Israeli satellites – AMOS-2 and AMOS-3. The company broadcasts more than 200 television stations from around the world, along with exclusive Israeli channels. In 2004, yes started offering its customers the first DVR (Digital video recorder) in Israel, called yesMax (similar in function to the TiVo).

STINGTV
The company markets itself as a "disassembled" TV service, customized to each customer, and offers specific content packages that can be ordered separately and can be combined. The packages offered are: movies, series, children, sport ONE, sports 1 and science and nature. There is also a family package, which offers all the packages at a cheaper price.

The service content consists of Idan + channels, which are freely transmitted to each dedicated digital converter, from additional channels that can be chosen specifically, and from VOD service where content is offered as part of the packages chosen by the customer. In addition, the service is provided on AndroidTV converter, either via a proprietary STINGTV BOX converter, or with a separate androidTV converter, which can be purchased independently, in which you can download a variety of content applications such as DailyMotion, YouTube, Netflix, and more.

High definition 

On 23 December 2007 yes began broadcasting in high definition. The broadcasting format is Widescreen 16:9 with resolution of 1080i50. The broadcasting system is DVB-S2 and H.264. There is also support for content in 720p. On some of the content there is also 5.1 Dolby Digital sound. In April 2011, yes had 18 HD channels (one of them in 3D). Receiving the broadcastings in HD is available only with yes HD set-top boxes - ADB 7820S - which has multiple digital and analog outputs - including HDMI (1.3a) and S/PDIF - coaxial and optical.

On 22 April 2009 yes released the HD-DVR set-top box - yesMaxHD (ADB 7820SX/7720SX) - which can record two shows simultaneously, also in High Definition.
In the beginning of May 2010, yes started to provide Russian language audio track for HD movie channels.

In November 2011 yes introduced a Streamer feature within yesMaxHD available to those who purchase the VOD feature, yes Named this yesMaxTOTAL'''''.

As of 2021, the yes Streamer feature is no longer available and has been discontinued.

Technical problems 
In September and October 2007, satellite television channels in Israel were plagued with signal disruptions, with the north of the country particularly badly affected. Eventually the Ministry of Defense intervened, and with the help of the Israel Defense Forces and Israeli Sea Corps, discovered that the problems had been caused by the radar systems of Dutch UNIFIL ships patrolling off the coast of Lebanon. In order to compensate its clientele, yes offered their pay-per-view "DVDbox" channels free to all clients for 2 weeks in October (although it eventually extended beyond that). Later, in an effort to win over many clients who were still displeased, yes offered all of its premium channels free for a period of 3 months.

Criticism

Involvement in Israeli settlements

On 12 February 2020, the United Nations published a database of companies doing business related in the West Bank, including East Jerusalem, as well as in the occupied Golan Heights. Yes was listed on the database on account of its activities in Israeli settlements in these occupied territories, which are considered illegal under international law.

See also 
 Yes Stars 
 Television in Israel
 Hot (Israel)

References

External links

Channel and transponder list

 
Cable and DBS companies of Israel
Direct broadcast satellite services
Telecommunications companies of Israel
Israeli brands